Tafadzwa Raphael Kutinyu (born 22 December 1994) is a Zimbabwean professional footballer who plays as a midfielder for Horoya AC and the Zimbabwe national football team.

References

External links

Tafadzwa Kutinyu at Footballdatabase

1994 births
Living people
Zimbabwe Premier Soccer League players
Zimbabwean footballers
Zimbabwe international footballers
Association football midfielders
Notwane F.C. players
Bantu Tshintsha Guluva Rovers F.C. players
Chicken Inn F.C. players
Singida United F.C. players
Azam F.C. players
Horoya AC players
Tanzanian Premier League players